The Alexander Dennis Enviro400 City is a low-floor double-decker bus produced by the British bus manufacturer Alexander Dennis since 2018, produced as an alternative to the standard Alexander Dennis Enviro400 MMC bodywork. The Enviro400 City is produced at Alexander Dennis' Falkirk and Scarborough factories in the United Kingdom. It is available as a complete integral diesel or hybrid bus, as well as bus bodywork on the BYD Auto battery electric or Scania N280UD compressed natural gas-powered chassis.

Introduction 

The Enviro400 City can trace its design roots back to 1997, with the introduction of the Dennis Trident 2, one of the first low-floor double-decker buses to enter service. The model saw immense success at the turn of the millennium, despite financial difficulties facing Dennis Specialist Vehicles during this period. As a result of these, production of the Trident 2 passed first to TransBus International in 2001 and then to Alexander Dennis in 2004.

Alexander Dennis updated the basic Trident 2 chassis to launch the Alexander Dennis Enviro400 in 2005 – the basic chassis of which was initially still badged internally as a Trident. A second-generation Enviro400 was launched in 2009, with facelifted styling and updated chassis design which finally dropped the Trident moniker. The second-generation Enviro400 was overhauled again to create the Enviro400 MMC, which was launched as the classic model's eventual replacement in 2014. Production of the Enviro400 ceased in 2018.

In late 2015, Alexander Dennis launched the Enviro400 City, a premium model of the Enviro400 MMC, featuring restyled front and rear ends to match the single-decker Enviro200 MMC and a glass staircase as standard amongst other features, designed to compete with the New Routemaster and Wright SRM designs in the London bus market.

Powertrain variants

Conventional diesel 
Blackpool Transport became the first operator outside London to order the Enviro400 City on conventional diesel-powered chassis in January 2016, with the new buses upgrading the operator's 9 service to high-specification 'Palladium' standard. Other orders were delivered to Uno of Hertfordshire in 2017, branded for The Comet routes 613 and 644; Arriva Buses Wales, with 13 Cities also delivered in 2017 for Arriva Sapphire services in Wrexham; Plymouth Citybus, who had 26 Enviro400 Cities, some featuring 'Spark' route branding, delivered between 2017 and 2019; Bluestar, who had 20 Enviro400 Cities delivered in 2018 for their 18 service, and First Glasgow, who had ten Enviro400 Cities delivered for their 500 Glasgow Airport Express in 2019. 

Two Enviro400 Citys were uniquely built for high-specification private hire use for independent operator Southern Transit in April 2018, nicknamed 'Citymasters' by the operator.

In February 2023, Reading Buses ordered seven  Enviro400 Citys, the first of the type to be built to this length, intended to be built with high-specification interiors with 76 seats for use on Green Line bus routes 702 and 703.

Nineteen Scania N250UDs with Enviro400 City bodies were delivered to First Eastern Counties for their flagship 'Excel' services in 2020, featuring high-specification interiors, next stop announcements and camera mirrors.

Enviro400H/ER 

The Enviro400 City was initially launched on the Enviro400H hybrid electric platform developed by Alexander Dennis and BAE Systems, which was carried over from the previous Enviro400. The first production examples of the Enviro400 City entered service with Arriva London on route 78; a repeat order in 2016 would later see this fleet grow to a total of 53 Enviro400 City hybrids. 

The HCT Group were also customers of the hybrid Enviro400 City for its Transport for London 'red bus' contracts, taking delivery of 47 of the type between 2016 and early 2017 for service on routes 26 and 388, then later taking delivery of nine more for operation on route 20 in 2019.

Transport for Ireland ordered 600 examples of the Enviro400ER, the successor to the Enviro400H chassis launched in 2019. Delivery of the first 100 Enviro400 ERs commenced in late 2020; all are to be supplied with City bodies.

Enviro400 CNG 

The Enviro400 CNG was launched in 2016 at the Euro Bus Expo, built on the Scania N280UD compressed natural gas-powered chassis. The Enviro400 CNG was only available with the City body, although some earlier models were delivered with MMC bodies. 

Nottingham City Transport have been the largest customer for the Enviro400 CNG, taking delivery of 120 examples between 2017 and 2019 as part of a major fleet renewal programme, making Nottingham City Transport the largest operator of double-decker biogas buses in the world. An additional 23 Enviro400 CNGs have been ordered for delivery in summer 2022, which the operator expects to be its last. 22 Enviro400 CNGs with both MMC and City bodies also entered service with Reading Buses between 2016 and 2018.

First West of England initially ordered an Enviro400 CNG for services in Bristol in 2017, which was later followed by an order for 21 Enviro400 CNGs for service on Bristol Metrobus pink line m1. Due to First's Bristol depots being unable to support the route, the buses were subcontracted out to CT Plus Bristol. A further 77 Enviro400 CNGs entered service with First West of England in early 2020.

Enviro400EV 

In 2018, Alexander Dennis, in partnership with BYD Auto, launched the Enviro400EV battery electric bus, built with the Enviro400 City body. It is the second battery electric bus model from Alexander Dennis, following 2016's launch of the single deck Enviro200EV, also in partnership with BYD. Initially, the first 10.9 metre variants first entered service with TfL operator Metroline on route 43 in 2019, followed by a shorter 10.3 metre variant launched in 2021. A second-generation Enviro400EV, featuring a newly-restyled exterior, a new Voith driveline with a 410kW peak power output, as well as options for either 472kWh or 354kWh NMC batteries, was unveiled by Alexander Dennis in November 2022.

A number of Enviro400EVs have entered service with TfL operators across London. Customers include Go-Ahead London, Metroline, RATP Dev Transit London, Stagecoach London and Abellio London. Ten of Stagecoach London's Enviro400EVs were used to shuttle delegates and world leaders at the 2021 United Nations Climate Change Conference in Glasgow prior to entering London service, while a batch of Abellio Enviro400EVs operating on route 63 were delivered with enhanced interiors specified under TfL's Future Bus project. Go-Ahead London also took delivery of eighteen Enviro400EVs fitted with pantograph chargers for service on route 132 in 2021.

National Express West Midlands ordered 29 Enviro400EVs, with the first 19 entering service in Birmingham in July 2020 and an additional 10 arriving at Coventry later in the year. National Express Coventry are due to receive 130 Enviro400EVs in early 2023 as part of Coventry's plans to have the first all-electric bus fleet in a UK city.  Four Enviro400EVs entered service with the National Express Transport Solutions, the tour coaching arm of the National Express Group, in May 2022 for tourist shuttle services to the Warner Bros. Studios complex in Leavesden.

Stagecoach Manchester ordered 32 Enviro400EVs, which were delivered in early 2020, while Stagecoach in Cambridge received two, which entered service in February 2020 on the Cambridge Citi 6 route. 22 Enviro400EVs were also delivered to Stagecoach Bluebird for service in Aberdeen in April 2022. Stagecoach were the first operator to order the second-generation Enviro400EV, ordering 55 of the type in January 2023 for delivery to Stagecoach in Oxfordshire later in the year.

First Leeds ordered five Enviro400EVs for the Stourton Park & Ride, which entered service with the opening of the site in mid-2021, while First Glasgow also ordered 91 Enviro400EVs alongside 22 Enviro200EVs in 2021. Delivery of the first batches of these buses began following the COP26 conference. Four Enviro400EVs were delivered to Lothian Buses in March 2021 with branding advertising Scottish Power, who helped to fund Lothian's order for the buses, and 12 Enviro400EVs were delivered to Xplore Dundee, entering service in early 2022.

Transport for Greater Manchester ordered 100 Enviro400EVs in 2022 for use on its franchised 'Bee Network' bus services, which will commence operations in September 2023; the first 50 buses are to enter service with Go North West in Wigan and Bolton, while the remaining 50 will enter service with another operator on routes in Bury, Oldham and Rochdale.

Enviro400FCEV 
Alexander Dennis introduced the Enviro400FCEV fuel cell bus in 2021, with the first completed example of the type being shown at the 2022 Euro Bus Expo.

Twenty Enviro400FCEVs have been ordered by the Liverpool City Region Combined Authority for use on contract to both Stagecoach Merseyside and South Lancashire and Arriva Merseyside. The buses will be the first to be branded for Liverpool's new MetroBus network and are planned to initially operate on the city's busiest route connecting Liverpool with St Helens. The first bus from this order was completed in November 2022.

See also 

 List of buses

References

External links 
 Alexander Dennis product descriptions for Enviro400 range

Enviro400 MMC
Double-decker buses
Low-floor buses
Vehicles introduced in 2014
Battery electric buses
Fuel cell buses